Village of the Damned is a 1995 American science fiction-horror film directed by John Carpenter and starring Christopher Reeve, Linda Kozlowski, Kirstie Alley, Michael Paré, Mark Hamill, and Meredith Salenger. It is based on the 1957 novel The Midwich Cuckoos by John Wyndham, which was previously adapted into the 1960 film of the same name. The 1995 version is set in Northern California, whereas the book and original film are both set in the United Kingdom. The 1995 film was marketed with the tagline, "Beware the Children".

This was the last publicly released film starring Reeve before he was paralyzed in an equestrian accident in May 1995, as well as his last theatrically released film. The film was panned by critics and failed at the box office upon release.

Plot  
The people and animals of the sleepy coastal town of Midwich in California's Marin County fall asleep at a 10 AM "blackout" and regain consciousness at 4 PM. Following the blackout, ten women of child-bearing age mysteriously fall pregnant, including a virgin girl and a married lady who has not been sexually active for a year due to her husband being away for work in Tokyo. None of them seek abortions after having dreams, and all the babies are born the same night in a barn – five boys and five girls, though the virgin's daughter is stillborn due to umbilical cord asphyxia. The surviving children are healthy but have pale skin, white-blonde hair, cobalt eyes, and fierce intellect.

However, they do not appear to possess a conscience or individual personalities. They display eerie psychic powers that can result in violent and deadly consequences whenever they experience pain or provocation. The children soon "pair off" like mates, except for David, whose intended mate was the stillborn girl. As a result, David is the outcast of the group. Although he retains some degree of psychic powers, he also has the ability to show human compassion. He talks to his mother, Jill McGowan, the school principal, and begins to understand his situation. The children's leader is Mara, the daughter of the physician, Dr. Alan, and his wife, Barbara. As a baby, Mara used her powers to force her mother to commit suicide by jumping off a cliff. Her mate is Robert.

The children, who now have a bad reputation in town, eventually move to the local barn as their classroom for survival. Local priest Father George attempts to shoot them, only for Mara to use her powers and force George to shoot himself. Soon, it is learned that there are other colonies of blackout children in foreign countries, but due to their inhuman nature, they were quickly eliminated, in some cases at the cost of destroying the entire town. The scientific team in Midwich flees the town to escape the chaos. One of the scientists, Dr. Susan Verner, is forced to show the children the well-preserved alien corpse of David's intended mate she secretly kept for research. The children force her to commit suicide by impaling herself. An angry mob gathers to kill the children, but the town descends into chaos.

Alan devises a plan to detonate a bomb inside a briefcase in the children's classroom. By thinking of a brick wall, he is able to create a mental barrier and keep the presence of the bomb a secret from the children. Jill begs him to spare David because he is not like the others. Alan attempts to do this by asking David to leave to get his notebook from his car. The children begin to suspect that Alan is hiding something. Mara's true face shows through as she breaks through Alan's defenses, revealing the bomb. The other children look at the clock, and the bomb explodes, killing everyone inside, including Alan. Jill holds David outside during the explosion.

While driving, Jill tells David: "We'll go someplace where nobody knows who we are."

Main cast 
 Christopher Reeve as Dr. Alan Chaffee, the town doctor
 Linda Kozlowski as Jill McGowan, the school principal, and a widow who becomes the mother of David
 Kirstie Alley as Dr. Susan Verner, an epidemiologist working for the Federal government of the United States, who investigates the mass pregnancies
 Michael Paré as Frank McGowan, Jill's late husband
 Meredith Salenger as Melanie Roberts, a virgin whose baby is stillborn
 Mark Hamill as Reverend George, the town minister
 Pippa Pearthree as Sarah, Reverend George's wife
 Peter Jason as Ben Blum
 Karen Kahn as Barbara Chaffee, Dr. Chaffee's wife

The Children 
 Thomas Dekker as David McGowan, son of Jill McGowan
 Lindsey Haun as Mara Chaffee, daughter of Dr. Alan and Barbara Chaffee
 Cody Dorkin as Robert, brother of Melanie Roberts
 Trishalee Hardy as Julie, daughter of Ben and Callie Blum
 Jessye Quarry as Dorothy
 Adam Robbins as Isaac, son of Reverend George and Sarah
 John Falk as Matt
 Renee Rene Simms as Casey
 Danielle Keaton as Lily

Production

Development 
According to Carpenter, there had been attempts to remake Village of the Damned since Invasion of the Body Snatchers had been successfully remade in 1978. In 1981, Lawrence Bachmann, who was head of MGM-British Studios when the 1960 film was made, said he was going to remake the movie. "I couldn't really do the book properly then," he said. "Twenty years ago, you couldn't talk about abortion; censorship didn't even allow you to mention impregnation. This time, we'll do it right." The project wound up at Universal, who approached Carpenter to remake it. He said, "I thought, 'Sure, it's an obvious choice, it's easy, that's a pretty easy movie to make.'"

Carpenter saw the original when he was 12 "and it stuck in my mind for several reasons. The whole idea of a whole town blacking out was 'Wow!' Also, I somehow got this incredible crush on one of the girls in the original. She was the first love object I had; I wanted her to zap me and take me over and make me do whatever she wanted." He said, "I also knew exactly where to shoot it. I live up there, Inverness, California, and Point Reyes, where we shot The Fog in 1979. I have a house up there. It's paradise; you can stand anywhere, put the camera down and shoot, and you've got it, it's there. It's a small town, plus it's home; I get to shoot at home for a change. So off we went."

Script 
Carpenter rewrote the script by David Himmelstein. "It's a truly great novel," he said. "It's funny but in all the drafts of the script I read everybody was trying to go in a different direction from the old picture and the novel. They avoided it being about an alien visitation, strangely. Come on, guys, we've got to tell the story now. It's there. So I went back to the original roots of it. Should be pretty good."

"You don't have to do much to the original, really," he said. "You've got to bring it up to date, humanize it a little and make the characters rich. When the original was made, you couldn't say the word `pregnant' on screen. So the birth scenes and the women weren't dealt with."

Shooting 
Carpenter said his relationship with the studio was "a good marriage, because we all had the same goals in mind...we all knew what story we wanted to tell. I can't tell you how impressed I am with Universal; the way they treated me, you can't get better than that."

Unlike its predecessor, the film was shot in widescreen color. Lloyd Paseman of The Register-Guard said that the shooting in widescreen color and the fact that major actors such as Christopher Reeve, Mark Hamill and Kirstie Alley were a part of the film made it so that the film was "anything but cheap".

Additional graphic violence was added in the remake. The children cause one adult to kill herself by stabbing herself with a scalpel and another adult to immolate herself.

"It was fun to do a drama like Village, as opposed to In The Mouth of Madness, which had a little edge to it," said Carpenter. "This is more straight. This is more a baby-boomer, middle-class kind of a movie. There's nothing wrong with that; I just hadn't done one of those in a long time. If you make a movie over $10 million, you have got to try to reach out to the broadest audience you can find. If you make it under $10 million, you're able to make it more quirky, more daring, more subversive, if you want to use that word. That's the joy of low-budget filmmaking. You can be tough, you can be down, you can be all sorts of things that from a business standpoint you can't do when you get over a certain budget."

If the children applied moderate psychic powers, their pupils would have the appearance of being green or red, and the color became a bright white when they applied strong psychic powers.

Charlotte Gravenor, the hairstylist, bleached the hair of the actors who played the children, and then applied white hairspray to their hair. This made them appear like aliens. Bruce Nicholson and Greg Nicotero applied a special effect where the eye pupil colors change when the children seize control of the adults.

Soundtrack

Reception 

In addition to being a failure at the box office, the film received negative critical response. Based on 37 reviews collected by Rotten Tomatoes, Village of the Damned holds a 30% approval rating from critics, with an average score of 4.1 out of 10. In 1996, the film was nominated at the 16th Golden Raspberry Awards for Worst Prequel, Remake, Rip-off or Sequel but lost to The Scarlet Letter.

Richard Harrington of the Washington Times gave the film a negative review, noting the poor decision-making from its characters and the lack of pacing, writing "Carpenter, whose batting average is dipping dangerously low, shows no grasp of character development, plot line or time passage." Lloyd Paseman of The Register-Guard said that while the remake did not attempt to make Village of the Damned "something" that its predecessor was not, the film had "mediocre" dialogue and plot development. He gave it two stars out of four. Paseman also remarked that in this film Reeve made an "earnest" attempt, that Kozlowski did the highest quality acting for the film, that Dekker was "credible", and that Hamill was "badly miscast". Gene Siskel critiqued the film harshly in his 0.5/4-star review, calling the film "an excruciating bore...not a single of one its lame cliches work" and later listed it on his bottom 10 of the year, while his frequent collaborator Roger Ebert gave the film 2/4 stars and said "[John Carpenter] directs the film quite masterfully...but one must ask why he picks the dullest, most idiotic screenplays. It's said he turned down Basic Instinct to direct this film...at that point, one must wonder if he's out to sabotage his own career." The San Francisco Chronicle gave the film a 1/4 star review, calling it "A trip to a village of the darned tedious" and said the film featured "some of the dumbest character writing to ever grace the silver screen."

Janet Maslin of The New York Times was more enthusiastic, regarding it as "John Carpenter's best horror film in a long while". The remake was "mostly more sly than frightening ... restaging the original story with fresh enthusiasm and a nice modicum of new tricks." James Berardinelli also gave the film a lukewarm 3/4-star review, calling it "an enjoyable, if obviously-flawed, amalgamation of horror and science fiction...it starts strong and does a decent job at keeping its momentum until a climactic finale...not Carpenter's shining achievement, but he still shows his promise."

In a 2011 interview, Carpenter described the film as a "contractual assignment" that he was "really not passionate about" and stated that it is one of his least favorite films that he's made as a director.

Audiences polled by CinemaScore gave the film an average grade of "C" on an A+ to F scale.

References

External links 

 
 
 
 
 
 
 

1995 films
1995 horror films
American science fiction horror films
1990s English-language films
Horror film remakes
Films directed by John Carpenter
1990s science fiction horror films
Films based on horror novels
Films based on science fiction novels
Films based on British novels
Films set in California
Films shot in California
Films set in 1995
Village of the Damned films
American remakes of British films
Films scored by John Carpenter
Films based on adaptations
Fiction about mind control
Films about children
1990s American films